Haliketi (also Romanized as Halīketī) is a village in Pain Khiyaban-e Litkuh Rural District, in the Central District of Amol County, Mazandaran Province, Iran. At the 2006 census, its population was 676, in 168 families.

References 

Populated places in Amol County